George Augustus Frederick Louis Curzon-Howe, 2nd Earl Howe (16 January 1821 – 4 February 1876) was a British peer and Conservative party politician.

Biography
Curzon-Howe was the eldest son of Richard William Penn Curzon-Howe, 1st Earl Howe, and first wife Lady Harriet Georgiana Brudenell.

He was commissioned as Captain "Viscount Curzon" in the Prince Albert's Own Leicestershire Yeomanry Cavalry in 1846. His father, Earl Howe, was Lieutenant-Colonel of the Regiment at the time and later became Lieutenant-Colonel Commandant in 1861. In 1861 George was promoted to Lieutenant-Colonel George A F L Visc. Curzon and shared the PAOLYC Colonelcy with Lieutenant-Colonel the Honourable Charles Powys (late 9th Lancers). In 1870 he became Lieutenant-Colonel Commandant 2nd Earl Howe PAOLYC on the death of his father, until his own death in 1876.

He was a Member of Parliament (MP) for the Southern Division of Leicestershire from 1857 to 1870.

He was a keen huntsman and exhibitor of his dogs. He was the first President of the Birmingham Dog Show Society, serving from 1860 to 1863 and again in 1870, 1872, 1874 and 1875.

Until the death of his father, George Curzon-Howe was styled 'Viscount Curzon' (it is a British custom for an earl's heir apparent to be referred to as a viscount, if the second most senior title held by the head of the family is a viscountcy). On his father's death in 1870, Curzon-Howe gained the title 2nd Earl Howe.  On his own death on 4 February 1876 at age 55, his titles passed to his brother Richard Curzon-Howe, 3rd Earl Howe.

Family
On 3 February 1846, Curzon-Howe married Harriet Mary Sturt, daughter of Henry Charles Sturt and wife Lady Charlotte Penelope Brudenell and they had one daughter: 
Lady Harriet Alice Howe d. 13 Apr 1875

References

External links
 

1821 births
1876 deaths
Curzon-Howe
Curzon-Howe
Curzon-Howe
Curzon-Howe
Curzon-Howe
Howe, E2
2
George
George